Michael James Moore (born August 21, 1970) is an American rowing coxswain. He competed in the men's eight event at the 1992 Summer Olympics.

References

External links
 

1970 births
Living people
American male rowers
Olympic rowers of the United States
Rowers at the 1992 Summer Olympics
Rowers from Philadelphia
Coxswains (rowing)